Events in the year 2018 in Iraq.

Incumbents
Presidents:Fuad Masum (until 2 October)Barham Salih (since 2 October)
Prime Minister: Haider al-Abadi
Vice President: Nouri al-Maliki, Usama al-Nujayfi, Ayad Allawi

Events
 15 January - Iraq's Ministry of Health reported that 27 people were killed and 64 injured by a double suicide bombing in central Baghdad. Although there were no immediate claims of responsibility, it was reported that such attacks had usually been the work of Islamic State in the past, and that elements of the group were still active north of the city despite the government's claim of victory in December 2017. Two days later (on Wednesday January 17, 2018) Islamic State "claimed responsibility for the twin suicide bombings in Baghdad this week", though the New York Times suggested that the delay, and a number of errors in the claim, may show that the group's "media apparatus has been disrupted".

 July 14 - Internet service was cut off in Baghdad, Najaf and Basra following anti-government protests in several cities.

Deaths

2 January – Ali Kadhim, footballer (b. 1949).
12 February– Kamal al-Hadithi, poet (b. 1939).
18 May – Ayad Futayyih Al-Rawi, military officer (b. 1942)
27 September – Tara Fares, Iraqi model and beauty blogger (b. 1996)

References

 
2010s in Iraq 
Years of the 21st century in Iraq 
Iraq 
Iraq